The 2002–03 Algerian Championnat National was the 41st season of the Algerian Championnat National since its establishment in 1962. A total of 16 teams contested the league, with USM Alger as the defending champions, The Championnat started on August 22, 2002. and ended on May 13, 2003.

Team summaries

Promotion and relegation 
Teams promoted from Algerian Division 2 2002–2003
 MC Alger
 US Chaouia

Teams relegated to Algerian Division 2 2003–2004
 ASM Oran
 MO Constantine

League table

Result table

References

External links
2002–03 Algerian Championnat National

Algerian Championnat National
Championnat National
Algerian Ligue Professionnelle 1 seasons